Mario de las Casas Ramírez (born 31 January 1905 – death 10 October 2002) was a Peruvian football defender who played for Peru in the 1930 FIFA World Cup and the 1935 Campeonato Sudamericano.

References

External links
FIFA profile

1905 births
2002 deaths
Footballers from Lima
Peruvian footballers
Peru international footballers
Peruvian Primera División players
Association football defenders
Club Universitario de Deportes footballers
Atlético Chalaco footballers
1930 FIFA World Cup players